Kaleybar County is in East Azerbaijan province, Iran. The capital of the county is the city of Kaleybar. At the 2006 census, the county's population was 87,259, in 19,250 households. The following census in 2011 counted 48,837 people in 12,760 households, by which time Khoda Afarin District had been separated from the county to form Khoda Afarin County. At the 2016 census, the county's population was 46,125 in 14,145 households.

In addition to the capital city, the county is noted for the Arasbaran forests protected area and the Bazz Galasi, the fortress of Babak Khorramdin.

Administrative divisions

The population history and structural changes of Kaleybar County's administrative divisions over three consecutive censuses are shown in the following table. The latest census shows two districts, seven rural districts, and two cities.

References

 

Counties of East Azerbaijan Province